Becoming Witch is a South Korean television series starring Lee Yu-ri, Lee Min-young, and Yoon So-yi. It aired on TV Chosun from June 25 to September 10, 2022, airing every Saturday at 21:10 (KST).

Synopsis 
Three women in their 40s reach a breaking point as their already-frustrating lives go completely off the rails.

Cast

Main 
 Lee Yu-ri as Gong Ma-ri
 She is a housewife and she has a satisfying life with her husband and daughter. She learns that her husband is having an affair. Gong Ma-ri seeks an alternative method to end her marriage.
 Lee Min-young as Chae Hee-soo
 She is a daughter-in-law of a chaebol family. Her marriage life is not going very well. She takes care of her mother-in-law, who is physically unwell and suffers from Alzheimer's. Chae Hee-soo endures her husband's indifference to her and she also experiences difficulties in becoming pregnant. One day, her mother-in-law gives her a terrifying, but tempting offer.
 Yoon So-yi as Yang Jin-a
 Her husband is not a good person. Her husband's death leads her to collect large amount of money from his life insurance policy. With that money, Yang Jin-a is able to live a different life than what she was previously accustomed to. But, she tries to protect her money and suffers from anxiety that her money will be taken away by someone.
 Jung Sang-hoon as Lee Nak-goo 
 The self-proclaimed celebrity broadcaster is suffering from a fever due to the love unexpectedly acquired during their marriage. He wanted a divorce because he wanted to live with love like fate. But he failed every time and took the last resort to end his marriage.

Supporting

People around Gong Ma-ri 
 Lee Young-ran as Jo Mal-ryun 
 Gong Ma-ri's mother.
 Kim Ye-gyeom as Lee Suzy 
 daughter of Gong Ma-ri and Lee Nak-goo.
Ye Soo-jung as Oh lak-eul 
 Is the president and advisor of a member botanical coffee shop. and form a strange bond with three women who become witches.
 Park Yoon-hee as Kim Ji-il 
 Gong Ma-ri's lawyer.
 Kim Hye-hwa as Heo Sook-hee 
 Oracle Cafe VVIP Membership.

People around Chae Soo-hee 
 Kim Young-jae as Nam Moo-young
An insurance company manager and indifferent husband's pronoun Chae Hee-soo, who suffers a lone illness from her father's deceased mother, is grateful.
 Sung Byun-sook as Park Soon-nyeo 
Chae Hee-soo'mother-in-law.
Kim Hyun-jun as Lee Nam-gyu 
A doctor at a fertility clinic and a single father raising a daughter alone.

People around Yang Jin-ah 
 Ryu Yeon-seok as Kim Woo-bin
Used to be a girl's first love. In the neighborhood and ex-husband of Yang Jin-a, he enters the multi-level arena with ambitions following his friend. But in a bad situation of debt So he decided to leave for his wife.
 Kim Sa-kwon as Jang Sang-pil 
Co-pilot of a civil aviation aircraft from the Air Force Academy.

People around Lee Nak-goo 
Han So-eun as Lim Go-eun 
 Vlogger Has a bright and endless personality. But she became unmarried early on. Because every man she meets is bad.
Jung A-mi as Kwak Hye-kyung 
 Lee Nak-goo's mother and Gong Ma-ri'smother-in-law she is a retired director of education, And she had a problem with an underage son who allowed her to marry Marie. but has an affair and wants a divorce.

Extended 
 Kom Do-gun as Yang Jin-ah's neighbour, a keymaker.
 Lee Won-jong as Natural Person on TV

Special appearance 
 Lee Kyu-han as Jo Doo-chang, Old friend of Yang Jin-ah.

Viewership

References

External links 
  
 
 
 

TV Chosun television dramas
Korean-language television shows
Television series by JS Pictures
South Korean mystery television series
South Korean comedy television series
2022 South Korean television series debuts
2022 South Korean television series endings
South Korean black comedy television series